Eremo della Madonna dell'Altare (Italian for Hermitage of Madonna dell'Altare) is an hermitage located in Palena, Province of Chieti (Abruzzo, Italy).

History 
It took three days to reach him because of the snow. During the annual festival of Ferragosto, the town organizes a hike up to the church, where they roast a pig. It is considered the most important and sacred of the churches in Palena. 
This history is totally wrong. My mother was born there in 1930. San Falco died on Monte Coccia in a modest hermitage constructed for him. In the 13th century Pietro Angelerio, the future Pope Celestine V, was a hermit in a cave in the Maiella area for 3 years. The Hermitage of Madonna dell'Altare was built in the 14th century by the Celestines next to this cave.

Architecture

References

External links
 

Madonna dell'Altare
Palena, Abruzzo